Kang Suh-chong was a South Korean-born martial artist and instructor who was a central figure in the establishment of Taekwondo in the United States.

Early years in South Korea 
Suh Chong Kang was born September 29th 1929 in Shineuju, North Korea. Kang started his martial arts training in 1938 in Yudo, Su Bahk Do.  He later became a student of Tang Soo Do/Kong Soo Do under Lee Won-kuk (Chung Do Kwan Founder) . Kang was a graduate of the first class of Chung Do Kwan black belts.

In 1953 Kang founded his own branch of taekwondo, naming it Kuk Mu Kwan. From 1957 to 1969 Kang served as the head martials arts instructor of the Korean Military Intelligence Agency. From 1960 to 1968, he was the commanding instructor for the Republic of Korea Army.

Career in United States 
In 1969, Kang and his family emigrated to the United States.  While working as a janitor in a boxing gym, Kang was discovered striking the heavy bags early one morning. Believing the reverberating sounds to be gunshots, the boxers at the gym were astounded to discover that the “gunshots” they heard were, in fact, the sound of Kang hitting the bag. These boxers became his first crop of students in the United States. Already an 8th Dan Black Belt, he founded his own Tae Kwon Do academy in Brooklyn, New York. Kang became the first President of the American Tae Kwon Do Association (ATA), serving from 1969 to 1978.

In the late 1970's, Kang served as the Vice President of the International Tae Kwon Do Federation. He was also the Chairman of the All American Tae Kwon Do Federation, based in Brooklyn,

Before his death, Lee Won-kuk promoted Kang to the rank of 10th Dan Black Belt.  He was the first one of the original Chung Do Kwan Black Belts to receive this honor.

Suh Chong Kang died peacefully in his sleep on January 30, 2022.

Legacy 
Kang's three sons are Tae Kwon Do Grand Masters who teach Kang's system in their own Tae Kwon Do schools and organizations.

On April 10, 2009 Kang was inducted into the Taekwondo Hall of Fame.

References

American male taekwondo practitioners
Living people
Year of birth missing (living people)